Uncoupling or uncouple may refer to:

 Uncoupling (neuropsychopharmacology), changes in neurochemical binding sites as a consequence of drug tolerance.

 An uncoupling protein in cell biology.
 An uncoupling agent in cell biology.

 Uncoupling (or decoupling) rail vehicles.

See also 
 Decoupling (disambiguation)
 Coupling (disambiguation)
 Coupler (disambiguation)
 Couple (disambiguation)
 Uncoupled, a Netflix romantic comedy series starring Neil Patrick Harris